The 1991 KAL Cup Korea Open was a men's tennis tournament played on outdoor hard courts that was part of the World Series of the 1991 ATP Tour. It was the fifth edition of the Seoul Open and was played at Seoul in South Korea from 15 April through 22 April 1991. Unseeded Patrick Baur won the singles title.

Finals

Singles

 Patrick Baur defeated  Jeff Tarango 6–4, 1–6, 7–6(7–5)
 It was Baur's 2nd title of the year and the 4th of his career.

Doubles

 Alex Antonitsch /  Gilad Bloom defeated  Kent Kinnear /  Sven Salumaa 7–6, 6–1
 It was Antonitsch's only title of the year and the 4th of his career. It was Bloom's 1st title of the year and the 3rd of his career.

References

External links
 ITF tournament edition details

 
KAL Cup Korea Open
Seoul Open